Hammel is a town in Taylor County, Wisconsin, United States. The population was 735 at the 2000 census. The unincorporated community of Murat is located in the town.

Geography
According to the United States Census Bureau, the town has a total area of 35.7 square miles (92.5 km2), of which, 35.5 square miles (91.9 km2) of it is land and 0.2 square miles (0.6 km2) of it (0.70%) is water.

Geologists believe the last glacier to advance into this area stopped its advance at a line running through northern Hammel, just south of Lake Isadore, then retreated. See the map and discussion in the article on Taylor County.

History
The six mile (10 km) square that would become Hammel was first surveyed in the summer of 1847 by a crew working for the U.S. government. Then in late 1857 another crew marked all the section corners in the township, walking through the woods and over frozen swamps, measuring with chain and compass. When done, the deputy surveyor filed this general description:
This Township contains several Tamarac and Cedar Swamp some of considerable extent and mostly unfit for cultivation. The Surface is generally rolling and 2nd rate soil except on the Black River bottoms it is 1st rate soil. Timber is very heavy all over the Township Chiefly Hemlock Birch Pine Maple Tamarac and Cedar.Black River enters the Township near the South East corner, it is generally Deep and flows in a gentle Current in a Westerly direction to the South West corner of the Township, not well adapted for good motive power or mills.

In 1933 parts of the northwest quarter of Hammel were designated part of the Chequamegon National Forest

Demographics
As of the census of 2000, there were 735 people, 265 households, and 219 families residing in the town. The population density was 20.7 people per square mile (8.0/km2). There were 346 housing units at an average density of 9.8 per square mile (3.8/km2). The racial makeup of the town was 98.78% White, 0.14% African American, 0.27% Native American, 0.68% Asian, and 0.14% from two or more races.

There were 265 households, out of which 38.9% had children under the age of 18 living with them, 75.8% were married couples living together, 3.0% had a female householder with no husband present, and 17.0% were non-families. 14.7% of all households were made up of individuals, and 4.9% had someone living alone who was 65 years of age or older. The average household size was 2.77 and the average family size was 3.05.

In the town, the population was spread out, with 27.5% under the age of 18, 8.2% from 18 to 24, 30.3% from 25 to 44, 26.5% from 45 to 64, and 7.5% who were 65 years of age or older. The median age was 36 years. For every 100 females, there were 108.2 males. For every 100 females age 18 and over, there were 114.1 males.

The median income for a household in the town was $51,250, and the median income for a family was $53,281. Males had a median income of $30,089 versus $26,319 for females. The per capita income for the town was $17,425. About 3.7% of families and 7.6% of the population were below the poverty line, including 10.4% of those under age 18 and 10.9% of those age 65 or over.

Notable people

 Anthony J. Opachen, Wisconsin State Representative and laborer, was born in the town

References

Towns in Taylor County, Wisconsin
Towns in Wisconsin